Dennis Dottin-Carter (born February 4, 1981) is an American football coach and former player. He is currently the senior defensive analyst for the University of Minnesota. He served as the interim head coach at Delaware in 2016, having been named to the position on October 16, 2016. He previously has been an assistant coach at both Delaware and the University of Maine. He played football for Maine under coach Jack Cosgrove.

Head coaching record

†Delaware had a record of 2–4 (0–3 CAA) prior to Dave Brock being relieved of head coaching duties.

References

External links
 Yale profile
 UConn profile

1981 births
Living people
American football linebackers
UConn Huskies football coaches
Delaware Fightin' Blue Hens football coaches
Maine Black Bears football coaches
Maine Black Bears football players
Yale Bulldogs football coaches
Sportspeople from Cambridge, Massachusetts
Coaches of American football from Massachusetts
Players of American football from Massachusetts
African-American coaches of American football
African-American players of American football
20th-century African-American sportspeople
21st-century African-American sportspeople